John Lillie may refer to:

John Lillie (minister) (1806–1866), Presbyterian minister in Australia
John Lillie (politician) (1847–1921), American representative from Washington State 
John Scott Lillie (1790–1868), British Army officer

See also
John Lilly (disambiguation)
John Lilley (disambiguation)